Palanti is an Italian surname.

Diffusion
The surname Palanti is present in Tuscany and Lombardy. Near Florence is the highest number of peoples named Palanti. In Lombardy there is a family branch with origin nearby Cremona and extension in Milan, Brescia and Roma.

Etymology
The surname is from the Greek Pallas/Pallade.

Story
The Lombard branch has documented origin since the 18th century from Casalbuttano.

Biographies
 Giuseppe Palanti, painter.
 Mario Palanti, architect.
 Riccardo Palanti, painter.
 Giancarlo Palanti, architect.
 Giuseppe Enzo Palanti, composer.

Bibliography
Giovanni Triacchini, Genealogie casalbuttanesi, edited for giubileo AVIS, Casalbuttano, 1996

See also
 Palandomus
 Civico Mausoleo Palanti

Surnames
Italian-language surnames